Guy Edward Blelloch is a professor of computer science at Carnegie Mellon University. He is known for his work in parallel programming and parallel algorithms. He teaches the 15-853: Algorithms in the Real World course, the 15-492: Parallel Algorithms (Spring 09) course, and the 15-210: Parallel and Sequential Data Structure and Algorithms (Fall 11) course at the Carnegie Mellon University.
In 2011 he was inducted as a Fellow of the Association for Computing Machinery.

Blelloch is the recipient of 2021 IEEE CS Charles Babbage Award, in recognition of "contributions to parallel programming, parallel algorithms, and the interface between them."  In particular, his research contributions have been in the interaction of practical and theoretical considerations in parallel algorithms and programming languages.  His early work on implementations and algorithmic applications of the scan (prefix sums) operation has become influential in the design of parallel algorithms for a variety of platforms. His work on the work-span (or work-depth) view for analyzing parallel algorithms has helped develop algorithms that are both theoretically and practically efficient. His work on the Nesl programming language developed the idea of program-based cost-models, and nested-parallel programming. His work on parallel garbage collection was the first to show bounds on both time and space. His work on graph-processing frameworks, such as Ligra, GraphChi and Aspen, have set a foundation for large-scale parallel graph processing. His recent work on analyzing the parallelism in incremental/iterative algorithms has opened a new view to parallel algorithms—i.e., taking sequential algorithms and understanding that they are actually parallel when applied to inputs in a random order.

See also
 Parallel programming

References

External links
 Official website
 

American computer scientists
Year of birth missing (living people)
Living people
Fellows of the Association for Computing Machinery